Joseph-Marie Vien (sometimes anglicised as Joseph-Mary Wien; 18 June 1716 – 27 March 1809) was a French painter. He was the last holder of the post of Premier peintre du Roi, serving from 1789 to 1791.

Biography
He was born in Montpellier. Protected by Comte de Caylus, he entered at an early age the studio of Natoire, and obtained the grand prix in 1745. He used his time at Rome in applying to the study of nature and the development of his own powers all that he gleaned from the masterpieces around him; but his tendencies were so foreign to the reigning taste that on his return to Paris he owed his admission to the academy for his picture Daedalus and Icarus (Louvre) solely to the indignant protests of François Boucher.

When in 1776, at the height of his established reputation, he became director of the school of France at Rome, he refused to take Jacques-Louis David with him amongst his pupils, stating he was too old to teach a young artist. After his return, five years later, his fortunes were wrecked by the French Revolution; but he undauntedly set to work, and at the age of eighty (1796) carried off the prize in an open government competition. Napoleon Bonaparte acknowledged his merit by making him a senator.

Joseph-Marie Vien died in Paris, and was buried in the crypt of the Panthéon. He left behind him many other brilliant pupils, amongst whom were François-André Vincent, Jean-Antoine-Théodore Giroust, Jean-Baptiste Regnault, Joseph-Benoît Suvée, Jean-Pierre Saint-Ours, François-Guillaume Ménageot, Jean-Joseph Taillasson and others of high merit; nor should the name of his wife, Marie-Thérèse Reboul (1728–1805), herself a member of the academy, be omitted from this list. Their son, Marie Joseph, born in 1761, also distinguished himself as a painter.

Works

 Sainte Marthe recevant le Christ à Bethanie (1747), Église Sainte-Marthe, Tarascon
 Saint Jérôme méditant sur un crâne, La Fère, Musée Jeanne d'Aboville
 La résurrection de Lazare (1747), Église Sainte-Marthe, Tarascon
 L'embarquement de sainte Marthe (1751), Église Sainte-Marthe, Tarascon
 L'arrivée de sainte Marthe en Provence (1748), Église Sainte-Marthe, Tarascon
 La prédication de sainte Marthe (1748), Église Sainte-Marthe, Tarascon
 L'agonie de sainte Marthe (1748), Église Sainte-Marthe, Tarascon
 Les funérailles de sainte Marthe (1748), Église Sainte-Marthe, Tarascon
 Hermite endormi (1753), Musée du Louvre
 Dédale dans le Labyrinthe attachant les ailes à Icare (1754), Musée du Louvre
 St Theresa of Avila (1754-55), New Orleans Museum of Art
 La Douce Mélancolie (1756), Cleveland Museum of Art
 L'Enlèvement de Proserpine (1762), Museum of Grenoble
 La Marchande d'amours (1763), Palace of Fontainebleau
 Une Femme qui sort des bains, 1763, (huile 95x68 cm) (private collection)
 Saint Denis préchant (1767), Church of Saint-Roch, Paris
 Grecque au bain (1767), Museo de Arte de Ponce, Puerto Rico
 Jeunes grecques parant de fleurs l'Amour endormi (1773), Musée du Louvre
 Venus, Wounded by Diomedes, is Saved by Iris (1775), Columbus Museum of Art
 Les adieux d'Hector et d'Andromaque (1786), Musée du Louvre
 Love Fleeing Slavery (1789), Princeton University Art Museum
 Saint Louis remet la régence à sa mère, Saint-Louis Chapel, École Militaire, Paris
 Toilette d'une jeune mariée dans le costume antique, (100x135 cm) (private collection)

Notes

References

External links

 Example of work: Cupid & Psyche, 1767

1716 births
1809 deaths
Artists from Montpellier
18th-century French painters
French male painters
19th-century French painters
Burials at the Panthéon, Paris
Members of the Sénat conservateur
Neoclassical painters
Premiers peintres du Roi
19th-century French male artists
18th-century French male artists